Hailu Fana (born 20 June 1967) is an Ethiopian former cyclist. He competed in the team time trial at the 1992 Summer Olympics.

References

1967 births
Living people
Ethiopian male cyclists
Olympic cyclists of Ethiopia
Cyclists at the 1992 Summer Olympics
Place of birth missing (living people)